Edgar Allan Woolf (April 25, 1881 – December 9, 1943) was an American lyricist, playwright, and screenwriter. He is best known as the co-author of the script for the 1939 film The Wizard of Oz.

Early years and education
Woolf was the son of Albert E. Woolf, a feather works employee, a manufacturer of disinfectant and an inventor of electrical devices, and Rosamond Wimpfheimer Woolf. Woolf attended City College of New York and Columbia University, graduating from the latter with an A.B. in 1901. He wrote the annual Varsity Show, The Mischief Maker, in his senior year.

Actor and playwright

Woolf joined the Murray Hill Stock Company as an actor, and played in New York City with it for several years, but soon was writing sketches and plays for vaudeville star Pat Rooney (1880-1962) and Mrs. Patrick Campbell. One of the better-known plays Woolf wrote for Pat Rooney was "Wings of Smoke." He also wrote, in collaboration with Jerome Kern, the comic opera, "Head over Heels," in which Mitzi Hajos starred. Woolf was a prolific writer and produced many sketches for vaudeville.

Woolf wrote the book for Mam'zelle Champagne, a musical revue, which opened June 25, 1906. On opening night at the outdoor Madison Square Garden Roof Theatre, millionaire playboy Harry K. Thaw shot and killed architect Stanford White. The otherwise undistinguished musical's run continued for some 60 performances largely on the publicity from this incident.

Woolf wrote the book for Toot-Toot, Henry W. Savage's 1918 Broadway musical based on Rupert Hughes' play Excuse Me. Woolf also wrote the lyrics for a song introduced in the show, "You're So Cute, Soldier Boy".

Screenwriter
Woolf moved to Los Angeles in the early 1930s to write screenplays for Metro-Goldwyn-Mayer. He and frequent collaborator Florence Ryerson revised Noel Langley's screenplay for The Wizard of Oz (1939), which in turn was based on L. Frank Baum's children's novel The Wonderful Wizard of Oz. Together they created the Wizard's counterpart, Professor Marvel.

Personal life
Woolf was described by Samuel Marx, MGM's story editor during the 1930s, as a "wild, red-haired homosexual."  He loved to cook and would spend hours cooking for his Saturday night dinner parties, where he entertained directors and writers.

Death
At his Beverly Hills home, 911 North Beverly Drive, Woolf's three servants found him lying at the bottom of a flight of steps that led to the kitchen. Woolf had a blind dog that he took for a daily walk, and the police believed he had tripped over the dog's leash, fracturing his skull. Woolf was taken to St. John's Santa Monica Hospital at 2 pm and died two hours later. The coroner's autopsy revealed the cause of death to be a basal skull fracture.

References

External links

 
 
 

1881 births
1943 deaths
20th-century American male actors
20th-century American dramatists and playwrights
20th-century American male writers
20th-century American screenwriters
Writers from Los Angeles
American male screenwriters
Columbia University alumni
City College of New York alumni
Male actors from New York City
American male dramatists and playwrights
American lyricists
Screenwriters from New York (state)
Screenwriters from California
Deaths from head injury
Accidental deaths from falls
Accidental deaths in California
American LGBT screenwriters